Carlos Alberto Enrique (born 12 December 1963 in Adrogué) is a former Argentine football defender who won the Copa América 1991 with Argentina. At club level he won the Copa Libertadores and Copa Intercontinental with Club Atlético Independiente in 1984.

Enrique started his playing career with Independiente in 1982, his first major success was being part of the team that won the Metropolitano in 1983.

In 1984 Enrique started at left back for the Independiente squad that won the Copa Libertadores and then the Copa Intercontinental against Liverpool F.C.

Enrique joined River Plate in 1988 and helped the team to claim the 1989-90 league title.

In 1991 Enrique was called up to join the Argentina squad for the Copa América 1991, which they went on to win, later that year he secured another league title with River Plate.

Enrique played alongside his brother Héctor at River (1988–1990) and at  Club Atlético Lanús (1992–1993). His nephews, Fernando, Ramiro (both football) and Facundo (rugby), also became sportsmen.

Enrique also played for Gimnasia y Tiro, Banfield and All Boys in Argentina and Alianza Lima in Peru.

Enrique works as a football coach and has held assistant manager positions in teams such as Nueva Chicago, Almagro and Chacarita Juniors in Argentina and Aurora in Bolivia. He currently assists Diego Maradona as manager of Al Wasl SC of Dubai.

Honours

Club
 Independiente
 Metropolitano: 1983
 Copa Libertadores: 1984
 Copa Intercontinental: 1984
 River Plate
 Primera División Argentina: 1989-90
 Primera División Argentina: Apertura 1991

International
 Argentina
 Copa América: 1991

Notes

External links

 Profile at My Best Play

1963 births
Living people
People from Adrogué
Argentine footballers
Association football defenders
Club Atlético Independiente footballers
Club Atlético River Plate footballers
Club Atlético Lanús footballers
Club Atlético Banfield footballers
All Boys footballers
Club Alianza Lima footballers
Gimnasia y Tiro footballers
Argentina international footballers
Argentine Primera División players
Argentine expatriate footballers
Expatriate footballers in Peru
1991 Copa América players
Copa América-winning players
Enrique family
Sportspeople from Buenos Aires Province